Bruna Amarante da Silva (born 12 May 1984), simply known as Bruna, is a Brazilian professional footballer who plays as a centre back for Grêmio Esportivo Recanto da Criança Interativo.

Bruna played previously in the Kazakhstani women's football championship for BIIK Kazygurt, with which she made her Champions League debut in August 2012. She had played before in her home country.

Bruna was part of the Equatorial Guinea women's national football team at the 2011 FIFA Women's World Cup.

On 5 October 2017, Bruna and other nine Brazilian footballers were declared by FIFA as ineligible to play for Equatorial Guinea.

References

External links

1984 births
Living people
People from Petrópolis
Sportspeople from Rio de Janeiro (state)
Brazilian women's footballers
Afro-Brazilian sportspeople
Women's association football central defenders
Saad Esporte Clube (women) players
BIIK Kazygurt players
CR Vasco da Gama (women) players
São José Esporte Clube (women) players
Campeonato Brasileiro de Futebol Feminino Série A1 players
Brazilian expatriate women's footballers
Brazilian expatriate sportspeople in Kazakhstan
Expatriate women's footballers in Kazakhstan

Equatorial Guinea women's international footballers
2011 FIFA Women's World Cup players